The Yellala Falls (Rapides de Yelala or Chutes Yelala; also spelled as Ielala) are a series of waterfalls and rapids on the Congo River just upstream from Matadi in the Democratic Republic of the Congo.
The Congo is the second largest river in the world by volume of water discharged, and the deepest in the world. The section of river that ends with the Yellala falls has over 300 species of fish, many found nowhere else.

Location

The region drained by the Congo River covers one eighth of Africa, including both tropical rain forest and savanna, much of it in a huge, shallow basin. The present system of rivers seems to date from around five million years ago, not long ago on a geological time scale. At that time the Atlantic continental margin was lifted up and formed a barrier between the basin and the sea. The river is navigable both above and below this stretch, called the lower Congo.

The upper portion of the Lower Congo starts with the steep Livingstone Falls just below Kinshasa and continues for  through a number of smaller rapids.
About  of water flows over the falls each second.

First European discovery

The Yellala Falls were reached by Europeans as early as 1485, when the Portuguese explorer Diogo Cão took a group of men as far as the falls before they were forced to turn back by disease, probably malaria. In that place he set a padrão, a large stone cross-shaped marker, customary during the Portuguese Age of Discovery. The stone, which was not rediscovered until 1911, bears the words: "Aqui chegaram os navios do esclarecido rei D.João II de Portugal - Diogo Cão, Pero Anes, Pero da Costa." ("Here arrived the ships of illustrious John II, King of Portugal – Diogo Cão, Pero Anes, Pero da Costa".)

Later European visitors and descriptions

Captain James Hingston Tuckey visited in 1816. He said that the local people thought the falls were the residence of an evil spirit, and that anyone who saw them would never see them again. Visiting in the dry season, he was disappointed by the falls. He described the site as comprising a large hill of syenite, a course-grained igneous rock, on the south side. The northern side, made of the same material, was not as high, but steeper than the south. He described the river as having forced its course and within the middle of the river an island of slate "still defies its power, and breaks the current into two narrow channels; that near the south side gives vent to a great mass of water, over which the torrent rushes with great fury and noise, as may easily be conceived".

Tuckey, who was sponsored by the Royal Geographical Society of London to obtain information on the slave trade, noted the brutality of the Portuguese slave trade and gathered valuable information about the geography, animals, plants, minerals and people of the region.
Talking of the people who lived above the falls, Tuckey said that fowls, eggs, manioc and fruits were the property of women. The items were never dealt with by the men without a discussion with their wives. Beads were given as presents from the men.

In 1848 the Hungarian László Magyar ascended the Congo to the Yellala falls, before spending five years exploring the region to the south. Due to his lack of contact with the outside world, the valuable information that he gathered received little circulation.

Sir Richard Francis Burton, who first saw the falls in 1863, wrote a description of the great Yellala. Waves developed in the course of the river "for a mile and a half above". Afterwards, the water heads down a slope of around thirty feet "in 300 yards, spuming, colliding and throwing up foam, which looks dingy white against the dull yellow-brown of the less disturbed channel - the movement is that of waves dashing upon a pier". He went on: "The old river-valley, shown by the scarp of the rocks, must have presented gigantic features, and the height of the trough-walls, at least a thousand feet, gives the Yellala a certain beauty and grandeur. The site is apparently the highest axis of the dividing ridge separating the maritime lowlands from the inner plateau".

The explorer Henry Morton Stanley, who visited the falls on April 6, 1880, wrote that over a five or six mile stretch the incline was only , but that the "general fury of the water is caused by the obstructions which the giant volume meets in the bed of the narrow defile." Sir Harry Johnston, who visited the falls in 1883, called the river "the last grand fall of Yellala" and detailed the sight and sounds of his impression of the falls.

Ecological importance

The Yellala Falls and the other falls and rapids upstream have largely isolated the aquatic fauna of the Congo Basin for around five million years, a significant period on an evolutionary timescale.
The cichlid genera Steatocranus, Nanochromis, Lamprologus and Teleogramma are found only in the Congo basin. Several dozen species in these genera are found only in the lower Congo. Steatocranus are rheophilic, meaning they have adapted to living in fast water. The four species of Teleogramma are found only in the lower Congo rapids. Genetically distinct populations have been found on opposite sides of the river.

Notes

References

Sources

External links

Congo River
Waterfalls of the Democratic Republic of the Congo